Dye It Blonde is the second studio album by the band Smith Westerns, released on January 18, 2011 on Fat Possum Records.

Critical reception

Dye It Blonde received acclaim from contemporary music critics. At Metacritic, which assigns a normalized rating out of 100 to reviews from mainstream critics, the album received an average score of 80, based on 30 reviews, which indicates "generally favorable reviews".

Track listing

References 

2011 albums
Smith Westerns albums
Fat Possum Records albums
Albums produced by Chris Coady